"Maybe" is a song by English singer Emma Bunton from her second solo studio album, Free Me (2004). Containing bossa nova influences, the song was written by Bunton and Yak Bondy and produced by Mike Peden. "Maybe" was released on 13 October 2003 as the album's second single and entered the top 40 on various record charts. Bunton performed an edit of the song as her solo performance on The Return of the Spice Girls tour.

Production
The unusual inspiration behind the song was a soundtrack album of 1970s German porn music; Bunton and her collaborators "found some ideas out of that". She described the process as "mad" and "hilarious", while noting the style of the finished song is reminiscent of its origins.

Critical reception
A 2004 review of the album Free Me by BBC Music described the song as "a perfect pastiche of French fluffy '60s bubblegum pop". In 2006, Talia Kraines of the same website said the song had a "beehive razzamatazz".

Commercial performance
"Maybe" debuted at number six on the UK Singles Chart. In early 2004, "Maybe" began to receive airplay across Australia and continental Europe, where it achieved top-40 success and huge radio airplay, but it failed to emulate the major impact it had on the UK.

Early in January 2005, the song and its remix were solicited to US radio. Both versions climbed to a peak position of number six on the Billboard Hot Dance Club Play chart.

Music video
The music video for "Maybe" was directed by Harvey & Carolyn. The video is strongly inspired by the "Rich Man's Frug" scene from 1969 film Sweet Charity. Bunton began conceptualising the music video while she was in the process of writing; her inspiration was the "very sexy" stage musical Chicago. She chose to incorporate Bob Fosse's style of dancing (used in that musical) to create a "slick" and "different" work.

The video starts with Bunton entering a hall, which is a big theatre, all painted in white. She is wearing a white hooded trench coat, which she then removes to reveal a black dress with a pink collar and cuffs (the same as the one on the cover of the single). Throughout the video there is a lot of dancing scenes behind white, green and pink backdrops.

Track listings
 UK and European CD single
 "Maybe"
 "Don't Tell Me You Love Me Anymore"
 "Maybe" 
 "Maybe" 

 UK cassette single
 "Maybe"
 "Don't Tell Me You Love Me Anymore"
 "Maybe" 

 European CD single
 "Maybe"
 "Don't Tell Me You Love Me Anymore"

Credits and personnel
Credits adapted from the liner notes of Free Me.

 Emma Bunton – vocals, songwriting
 Yak Bondy – songwriting
 Richard Dowling – mastering
 Peter Gordeno – keyboards
 Martin Hayles – recording
 Nick Ingman – orchestra arrangement, orchestra conducting
 Isobel Griffiths Ltd – orchestra contractor
 Graham Kearns – guitar
 Mike Peden – percussion, production
 Charlie Russell – live drums, programming
 Mark 'Spike' Stent – mixing
 Paul Turner – bass

Charts

Weekly charts

Year-end charts

Release history

References

2003 songs
2003 singles
Emma Bunton songs
Songs written by Emma Bunton
Songs written by Yak Bondy
19 Recordings singles
Universal Records singles